The Men's classification is the most important men's classification, the one by which  the winner of the men's Cape Epic is determined. Since 2004, the leader of the general classification wears the yellow zebra jersey. Record champions are Christoph Sauser and Karl Platt with each 5 titles.

Winners

Statistics

By rider

By duo

By nationality

References

External links
Past-winners

Cape Epic classifications and awards
Cycling jerseys